"Wild International"  is the first track and single from One Day as a Lion's self-titled five track EP. This track was first revealed on July 16, 2008. It was made available to stream on the band's myspace page. On the same day the song was  premiered by the influential L.A. radio station KROQ-FM and on Australian radio station Triple J. It peaked at #20 on the Billboard Hot Modern Tracks, and #6 in Norway.

Inspiration

When Zack de la Rocha was asked about the song, he said,

When told the song seemed anti-religious, he said,

Charting

References

One Day as a Lion songs
2008 singles
2008 songs
Anti- (record label) singles
Anti-war songs
Songs critical of religion
Songs written by Zack de la Rocha